Railway stations in the Democratic Republic of Congo (DR Congo) include:

Maps 
 UN Map West
 UN Map East

Stations served by passenger trains

Stations served by rail

Existing

Matadi–Kinshasa Railway 

 Ango-Ango
 Matadi
 Mpozo
 Kenge
 Songololo
 Mbanza-Ngungu
 Kimpese
 Lukala- cement works
 Kintoni 
 Kwilu Ngongo
 Kisuntu
 Inkisi aka Kisantu
 Matete
 Madimba
 Kindamba
 Dembo
 Kasangulu
 (start of suburban area)
 Mont Ngafula
 Kinsenso
 Matete
 Ndjili
  Limete - Kinshasa - national capital; (river port railhead)
   (proposed road-rail bridge on border.) 
  Brazzaville

 Barumbu
 La Gombe
 Kitambo
 Ngaliema
 (local line to west)

 (local line to east)
 Limbe
 Masina
 Kinshasa Airport

Inland lines 

 Ilebo - (river port railhead)
 Bakwa-Kasanga

 Mweka
 Demba
 Kananga (was Luluabourg)
 Kamwandu
 Kazumba
 Mwene Ditu
 Lusuku
 Kamina - junction to north
 Tenke - junction to Angola
 Likasi
 Lubumbashi
  Sakania
 (border)
  Ndola

 Tenke - junction
 Kakopa
 Mutshatsha
 Kasaji
  Divuma
 (Angolan Border)
  Luau

 Kamina - junction
 Kabongo
 Musono
 Kabalo - junction to east
 Kongolo - river bridge
 Kindu - (river port railhead)

 Kabalo - junction to east
 Kazumba
 Kalemie - inland port on Lake Tanganyika

 Benaleka - major accident

Vicicongo line 

 Bumba (Congo river port)
 Aketi
 Buta
 Likati
 Isiro
 Mungbere - terminus
 Bondo - branch
 Titule - branch

Portage 
1000mm gauge portage railway bypassing Stanley Falls

 Kisangani (Congo River port)
 Ubundu (upper Congo River port)

Proposed 
 Kinshasa - national capital; (river port railhead) 
 (river ferry to be replaced by 1015 km long railway)
 Ilebo - (river port railhead)

   Brazzaville-Kinshasa Bridge

Closed

Mayumbe Railways (CFVM) 

 Boma - port
 Tshela - terminus

Kivu Railways (CEFAKI) 

 Uvira - port
 Kamanyola - connection to coach service to Bukavu (rail never finished; part of the Cape to Cairo Railway)

Tunnels 

 Lubumbashi (Elizabethville) 
 Matadi (270 m)

See also 
 Rail transport in DRC
 Transport in DRC
 Railway stations in Angola
 Railway stations in Congo
 Matadi-Kinshasa Railway

References

External links

Railway stations
Congo DR
Railway stations